This is a list of fossiliferous stratigraphic units in Senegal.



List of fossiliferous stratigraphic units

See also 
 Lists of fossiliferous stratigraphic units in Africa
 List of fossiliferous stratigraphic units in Cape Verde
 List of fossiliferous stratigraphic units in Guinea
 List of fossiliferous stratigraphic units in Mali
 List of fossiliferous stratigraphic units in Mauritania
 Geology of Senegal

References

Further reading 
 S. J. Culver, J. E. Repetski, J. Pojeta, Jr. and D. Hunt. 1996. Early and Middle (?) Cambrian metazoan and protistan fossils from West Africa. Journal of Paleontology 70(1):1-6
 A. Gorodiski and R. Lavocat. 1953. Premiere decouverte de Mammiferes dans le Tertiaire (Lutetien) du Senegal. Comptes Rendus sommaires de la Societe geologique de France 15:315-317
 L. Hautier, R. Sarr, R. Tabuce, F. Lihoreau, S. Adnet, D. P. Domning, M. Samb and P. M. Hameh. 2012. First prorastomid sirenian from Senegal (Western Africa) and the Old World origin of sea cows. Journal of Vertebrate Paleontology 32(5):1218-1222

Senegal
List
Senegal
Fossiliferous stratigraphic units
Fossil